The Chablis region of Burgundy is classified according to four tiers of Appellation d'origine contrôlée (AOC) designation. The top two are the crus of Chablis and include the 7 Grand cru vineyards followed by the lower Premier crus. Wines made entirely from fruit from these vineyards are entitled to list their wines as cru classé Chablis on the wine label. Below these tiers are the lower designations of basic Chablis AOC and Petit Chablis. Soil quality and hill slope play a major role in delineating the  differences. Many of the Premier Crus, and all the Grand Crus vineyards, are planted along valley of the Serein river as it flows into the Yonne with the best sites located on a southwest facing slope that receives the maximum amount of sun exposure. All of Chablis' Grand Cru vineyards and many of their better Premier Cru vineyards are planted on primarily Kimmeridgean soil (a composition of limestone, clay and tiny fossilized oyster shells) which is believed to impart more finesse and structure to the wines. Other areas, particularly the vast majority of Petit Chablis vineyards, are planted on slightly younger Portlandian soil.

Grand Cru vineyards
There is one Grand Cru in Chablis with seven officially delineated Grand Cru climats, covering an area of 247 acres (100 hectares), all located on one southwest facing hill overlooking the town of Chablis. There is one vineyard, La Moutonne, located on this hill between the Grand Cru vineyards of Les Preuses and Vaudésir that is considered an "unofficial" Grand Cru and it will appear on wine labels. However, the Institut National des Appellations d'Origine (INAO) does not recognize La Moutonne as a Grand Cru. 
Les Preuses
Vaudésir
Grenouilles
Valmur
Les Clos
Blanchot
Bougros
(unofficial) La Moutonne

Premier Crus

At the turn of the 21st century, there were 40 Premier cru vineyards in Chablis. In 2009, the official list was expanded to 89 vineyards. The names of many of these vineyards do not appear on wine labels because of an INAO allowance that permits the use of "umbrella names" - where smaller, lesser known vineyards are allowed to use the name of a nearby more famous Premier cru vineyard. Seventeen of the most well known "umbrella" vineyards are bolded below. 

Mont de Milieu - Vallée de Chigot
Montée de Tonnerre - Chapelot, Les Chapelots, Pied d’Aloup, Sous Pied d’Aloup, Côte de Bréchain
Fourchaume - Vaupulent, Vau Pulan, Les Vaupulans, La Fourchaume, Côte de Fontenay, Dine-Chien, L’Homme Mort, La Grande Côte, Bois Seguin, L’Ardillier, Vaulorent, Les Quatre Chemins, La Ferme Couverte, Les Couvertes
Vaillons - Sur les Vaillons, Chatains, Les Grands Chaumes, Les Chatains, Sécher, Beugnons, Les Beugnons, Les Lys, Champlain, Mélinots, Les Minos, Roncières, Les Epinottes
Montmains - Les Monts Mains, Forêts, Les Forêts, Butteaux, Les Bouts des Butteaux, Vaux Miolot, Le Milieu des Butteaux, Les Ecueillis, Vaugerlains
Côte de Léchet - Le Château
Beauroy - Sous Boroy, Vallée des Vaux, Benfer, Troësmes, Côte de Troësmes, Adroit de Vau Renard, Côte de Savant, Le Cotat-Château, Frouquelin, Le Verger
Vauligneau - Vau de Longue, Vau Girault, La Forêt, Sur la Forêt
Vaudevey - La Grande Chaume, Vaux Ragons, Vignes des Vaux Ragons
Vaucoupin - Adroit de Vaucopins
Vosgros - Adroit de Vosgros, Vaugiraut
Les Fourneaux - Morein, Côte des Près Girots, La Côte, Sur la Côte
Côte de Vaubarousse
Berdiot
Chaume de Talvat
Côte de Jouan
Les Beauregards - Hauts des Chambres du Roi, Côte de Cuissy, Les Corvées, Bec d'Oiseau, Vallée de Cuissy

See also
Burgundy wine
List of Burgundy Grand Crus

References

Wine regions of France
Burgundy (historical region) AOCs
Wine-related lists